The women's 4x400 metres relay event  at the 1997 IAAF World Indoor Championships was held on March 8–9.

Medalists

* Runners who participated in the heats only and received medals.

Results

Heats
First 2 teams of each heat (Q) and the next 2 fastest (q) qualified for the final.

Final

References

Relay
4 × 400 metres relay at the World Athletics Indoor Championships
1997 in women's athletics